The Night Watch is a live album (2-CD set) by the English rock band King Crimson, recorded in Amsterdam in 1973, and released in 1997.

Contents
This album contains an important performance in King Crimson's career, being the source of the improvisations "Trio" and "Starless and Bible Black", the Fripp instrumental "Fracture" and the intro to the song "The Night Watch", all of which were included, with some editing, in the 1974 album Starless and Bible Black. Prerecorded excerpts of (No Pussyfooting) appear at the end of "21st Century Schizoid Man" similarly to what was included at the beginning of USA.

Production
The concert was performed on 23 November 1973 at the 
Concertgebouw in Amsterdam, the Netherlands. Most of the concert was also broadcast live by the BBC and taped by listeners; bootlegs of the broadcast circulated among fans.  The concert began with a version of "Larks' Tongues in Aspic (Part I)", a recording of which has never been found.  Some bootlegs claim to have it but these are recordings from other sources.  It was one of the first releases of archival recordings by Discipline Global Mobile, the music company founded by Robert Fripp.

Art
Like the covers of many King Crimson albums, The Night Watch'''s cover features a painting by P. J. Crook, which is also entitled The Nightwatch''. The sleeve was designed by the Bill Smith Studio of London.

Track listing

Disc 1
"Easy Money" (Robert Fripp, John Wetton, Richard Palmer-James) – 6:14
"Lament" (Fripp, Wetton, Palmer-James) – 4:14
"Book of Saturday" (Fripp, Wetton, Palmer-James) – 4:07
"Fracture" (Fripp) – 11:28
"The Night Watch" (Fripp, Wetton, Palmer-James) – 5:28
"Improvisation: Starless and Bible Black" (David Cross, Fripp, Wetton, Bill Bruford) – 9:11

Disc 2
"Improvisation: Trio" (Cross, Fripp, Wetton, Bruford) – 6:09
"Exiles" (Cross, Fripp, Wetton, Palmer-James) – 6:37
"Improvisation: The Fright Watch" (Cross, Fripp, Wetton, Bruford) – 6:03
"The Talking Drum"  (Cross, Fripp, Wetton, Bruford, Jamie Muir) – 6:34
"Larks' Tongues in Aspic (Part II)" (Fripp) – 7:51
"21st Century Schizoid Man" (Fripp, Ian McDonald, Greg Lake, Michael Giles, Peter Sinfield) – 10:38

Recorded at the Concertgebouw, Amsterdam, the Netherlands, 23 November 1973

Credits
Recording Engineer: George Chkiantz
Mixing Engineer: David Singleton
Assistant Engineer: Alex Mundy.
Mixed at DGM World Central by David Singleton & Robert Fripp during July 1997.

Personnel
Robert Fripp – guitar, mellotron
John Wetton – bass guitar, vocals
David Cross – violin, viola, keyboards
Bill Bruford – drums, percussion

Charts

References

1997 live albums
King Crimson live albums
Discipline Global Mobile albums